The 2016–17 season will be Raith Rovers' eighth consecutive season in the second tier of Scottish football having been promoted from the then Scottish Second Division at the end of the 2008–09 season. Raith Rovers will also compete in the Challenge Cup, League Cup and the Scottish Cup.

Summary

Management
Raith were led by manager Gary Locke for the 2016–17 season for his 1st season at the club.

On 7 February 2017 Locke parted company with the club.

3 days later, John Hughes was appointed the new manager.

Results & fixtures

Pre-season

Scottish Championship

Scottish Championship play-offs

Scottish Challenge Cup

Scottish League Cup

Scottish Cup

Player statistics

Squad 
Last updated 13 May 2017

 

 

|}

Disciplinary record
Includes all competitive matches.

Last updated May 2017

Team statistics

League table

Division summary

Management statistics
Last updated on 13 May 2017

Notes

References

Raith Rovers F.C. seasons
Raith Rovers